The 1996 Girabola was the 19th season of top-tier football competition in Angola. Primeiro de Agosto were the defending champions.

The league comprised 14 teams, the bottom two of which were relegated.

Petro de Luanda were crowned champions, winning their 11th title, while Benfica do Huambo and Primeiro de Maio were relegated.

Zé Neli of Petro do Huambo finished as the top scorer with 12 goals.

Changes from the 1996 season
Relegated: Nacional de Benguela
Promoted: FC de Cabinda, Kabuscorp, Sonangol do Namibe

League table

Results

Season statistics

Top scorer
 Zé Neli

Champions

References

External links
Federação Angolana de Futebol

Girabola seasons
Angola
Angola